Bates Motel is an American psychological horror drama television series developed by Carlton Cuse, Kerry Ehrin, and Anthony Cipriano for A&E. 

Using characters and elements from the novel Psycho by Robert Bloch, the series serves as a "prequel" to the 1960 film of the same name directed by Alfred Hitchcock, albeit within a contemporary setting. Following the death of her abusive husband, Norma Louise Bates (Vera Farmiga) relocates to the fictional town of White Pine Bay, Oregon with her son Norman (Freddie Highmore). There, she purchases a small motel and attempts to start a new life with her son. They are soon intercepted by Norma's estranged son, Dylan Massett (Max Thieriot), who carries his own secrets. The three are quick to discover that the idyllic town is not at all what it seems and that dangerous secrets lurk around every corner.

The series premiered on March 18, 2013, and received generally positive reviews.

Series overview

Episodes

Season 1 (2013)

Season 2 (2014)

Season 3 (2015)

Season 4 (2016)

Season 5 (2017)

Ratings

References

External links
 
 

Episodes
Bates Motel
Bates Motel
Bates Motel